was a Japanese composer and writer.

Biography
He was born in Kitakyushu and lived in Tokyo and Kamakura. First he learned French Modern Music under Shiro Fukai and Tomojiro Ikenouchi. Then he studied under Joseph Rosenstock about how to conduct Beethoven's symphonies and he became very interested in German classical music and wrote many symphonies that made him end up being called, "Ogurahms". Then he faced a deadlock and abandoned most of his works.

Gradually, he became very interested in Bartók. Finally he broke a new ground and started writing his original music inspired by Japanese traditional folk songs and old nursery rhymes. He was also gifted writer who published several books. In the late period of his life he was passionate painter too who painted oil paintings.

He was a friend of Minoru Matsuya (1910–1995) and taught his son Midori Matsuya (1943–1994) harmony and composition.  He was also a teacher of Hiroaki Zakoji (1958–1987).

Works 
1937 Sonatine for piano
1953 Dance Suite for two pianos
1953 Dance Suite for orchestra
1954 String Quartet in B 
1957 Five Movements on Japanese Folk Songs for orchestra 
1958 Nine Pieces on Children's Songs of Tohoku Region for female chorus a cappella
1959 Burlesque for orchestra
1960 Sonatine for violin and piano
1963 Sonatine for string orchestra
1966 Composition I for piano
1968 Composition II for piano
1968 Symphony in G
1971 Concerto for violin and orchestra
1972 Composition for string orchestra
1975 Composition in F# for orchestra
1977 Composition for flute, violin and piano
1980 Concerto for violoncello and orchestra

See also 
Japan Composer's Association

External links
Japan Composer's Association, or JACOMPA - in Japanese
His scores are preserved in Tokyo Nippon Kindai Ongakukan - Documentation Centre for Modern Japanese Music

1916 births
1990 deaths
20th-century classical composers
20th-century Japanese composers
20th-century Japanese male musicians
20th-century Japanese male writers
20th-century Japanese writers
Concert band composers
Japanese classical composers
Japanese male classical composers
People from Kitakyushu